County Road 891 is a Norwegian county road in Troms og Finnmark, Norway. The mountain pass over Båtsfjordfjellet must be closed up to 65 times each winter due to snow storms.

History
Before 1 January 2010, Road 891 was a national road, after the regional reform came into force it has the status of a county road. In 2019, County Road 331 became part of Road 891.

References

891
891
Roads within the Arctic Circle